Old Federal Reserve Bank may refer to:

Old Federal Reserve Bank Building (Philadelphia)
Old Federal Reserve Bank Building (San Francisco)